is a Japanese Marxian economist specializing in Institutional economics, public finance and local government finance. He is best known for appearance in TV shows such as Sunday Morning or Asamade nama terebi and authoring several books and newspaper articles. Since 2000, he has been a professor at Keio University.

Life 
A native of Tokyo, Kaneko attended the University of Tokyo for both undergraduate and graduate studies.

References 

20th-century Japanese economists
21st-century Japanese economists
Marxian economists
Academic staff of Keio University
University of Tokyo alumni
People from Tokyo
1952 births
Living people
Academic staff of Ibaraki University